Spa Night  is a 2016 American drama film directed by Andrew Ahn and starring Joe Seo. It was shown in the U.S. Dramatic Competition section at the 2016 Sundance Film Festival. At Sundance, Joe Seo won the Special Jury Award for Breakthrough Performance.

Plot
David, an 18-year-old living in Koreatown, Los Angeles becomes an employee at a spa to help his financially struggling parents. He soon discovers illicit gay sex between the customers, which forces him to consider his own sexuality.

While this has been described as a coming out story, the focus is on the internal world of David, and his deep struggles and uncertainty, as a teenager, about how to be a good son but how to also be himself in what is a conservative family and rigid community.

Cast
 Joe Seo as David
 Haerry Kim as Soyoung
 Youn Ho Cho as Jin
 Tae Song as Eddie
 Ho Young Chung as Spa Manager
 Linda Han as Mrs. Baek
 Eric Jeong as Peter
 Yong Kim as Academy Director

Critical response
On review aggregator website Rotten Tomatoes, the film has an approval rating of 96%, based on 25 reviews, with an average rating of 6.80/10. On Metacritic the film has a score of 76 out of 100 score, based on 13 critics, indicating "generally favorable reviews".

References

External links
 
 
 

2016 films
2016 drama films
American drama films
Films about Korean Americans
2010s Korean-language films
American LGBT-related films
Films directed by Andrew Ahn
LGBT-related drama films
2016 LGBT-related films
2016 directorial debut films
Asian-American LGBT-related films
2010s English-language films
2010s American films
John Cassavetes Award winners